The Manado  is a river of North Sulawesi on Sulawesi island, Indonesia, about 2200 km northeast of the capital Jakarta. Tributaries include the Sawangan River, Timbukar River and the Ranoyapo River.

Geography
The river flows in the northern area of Sulawesi with predominantly tropical rainforest climate (designated as Af in the Köppen-Geiger climate classification). The annual average temperature in the area is 24 °C. The warmest month is May, when the average temperature is around 25 °C, and the coldest is January, at 22 °C. The average annual rainfall is 2462 mm. The wettest month is January, with an average of 315 mm rainfall, and the driest is September, with 75 mm rainfall.

References

Rivers of North Sulawesi
Rivers of Indonesia